Nicola Geuer (born 2 March 1988) is an inactive German tennis player.

Geuer has won four singles and ten doubles titles on the ITF Circuit. On 10 May 2010, she reached her best singles ranking of world No. 276. On 9 October 2017, she peaked at No. 91 in the doubles rankings.

Since October 2014, Geuer has played only in doubles competition.

ITF Circuit finals

Singles: 7 (4–3)

Doubles: 18 (10–8)

References

External links
 
 
 Official website 

1988 births
Living people
Sportspeople from Duisburg
German female tennis players
Tennis people from North Rhine-Westphalia